The Bane of Yoto is a thirteen-time award-winning science-fantasy novel by Josh Viola (creator) and Nicholas Karpuk, first published in June 2012 by music label FiXT Music owned by electronic rocker Klayton of Celldweller.

Logline: When a mythical dagger is plunged into his chest, Yoto is transformed from a meek member of an enslaved society into a beast fit for the gods.

The transmedia project also includes an audiobook read by film/TV actors JD Hart and Deb Thomas with music by Celldweller, a 3D Comic Book App developed by Leviathan Games and featuring music by Celldweller as well as merchandise that includes sculptures, PlayStation 3 Dynamic Themes, T-shirts, posters and more.

Joshua Viola recently announced on Facebook that Black Sky Brewery will be producing a beer after the franchise, titled "The Ale of Yoto."

The novel has won thirteen awards, including wins from the IPPY's, the International Book Festival, USA Best Book Awards, the 2012 New York Book Festival, 2012 Hollywood Book Festival, 2012 Halloween Book Festival (two awards) and the 2012 London Book Festival.

The 3D comic app has been featured by iTunes, Nvidia TegraZone and on over 50 "What's Hot" lists.

Book Plot

A gentle race known as the Numah have been enslaved by the fierce Olokun to mine the moon, Neos, in order to build a protective shield, called the Aegis, to protect both races from the disembodied Arbitrators - ancient gods who evolved beyond the physical realm.

Deep in the mines of Neos, a mythical dagger is unearthed. Yoto, a Numah miner, is accidentally stabbed in the chest with the dagger by an assassin who hoped to use it on Yoto's brother Eon, a rebel leading an uprising against the Olokun. But rather than perish beneath the blade, Yoto is transformed into a giant creature who the Arbitrators hope to possess and reclaim a connection to the physical world once again.

Prequel
The novel spawned the following prequel by NY Times bestseller Keith Ferrell and Viola (editor):
Bloodmoon: Birth of the Beast

3D Comic App

The Bane of Yoto app is an episodic 3D comic series led by Josh Viola and developed by Leviathan Games for mobile devices such as iPad, iPhone and Android tablets/devices. Based on the award-winning novel of the same name, the app features artwork by various professional comic book artists such as Tyler Kirkham of DC Comics, Nick Runge of IDW and Steve Scott of DC Comics with music by Celldweller.

Two episodes are currently available:
Episode I: Monster (free)
Episode II: Brothers

The app makes use of hand-drawn artwork which is later converted to 3D objects inside of Leviathan Games' Dreamotion engine. When viewing the comic on a compatible tablet or phone, the app responds to the user's movement and rotates the scene in 3D space to give the illusion of a living, breathing world.

Taglines
 Sometimes the events meant to destroy you are the conditions that bring you to life.
 When a mythical dagger is plunged into his chest, Yoto is transformed from a meek member of an enslaved society into a beast fit for the gods.

References

External links
The Bane Of Yoto homepage
Gregory Burkart Book Review: 'The Bane of Yoto' by Joshua Viola
Take a Closer Look at the 'Bane of Yoto' Comic App
Could The Bane Of Yoto Herald In A New Look For Digital Comics?

2012 American novels
2012 science fiction novels
2012 fantasy novels
American science fiction novels